Kaceřov is a municipality and village in Sokolov District in the Karlovy Vary Region of the Czech Republic. It has about 400 inhabitants.

Administrative parts
The village of Horní Pochlovice is an administrative part of Kaceřov.

Geography
It lies on the border of the Cheb Basin and Sokolov Basin. The Libocký Stream flows through the municipality.

History
The first written mention of Kaceřov is from 1312, when it was acquired by the Waldsassen Abbey. The most important owners of the estate were the Pergler of Perglas family. They held Kaceřov from the 1470s until the end of the 18th century.

Sights
The most important monument is the Kaceřov Castle with a park and castle pond. It is an example of a one-storey baroque rural feudal residence. The oldest monument in the municipality is the torso of the Marian column. Other smaller monuments are the statue of Saint Anthony of Padua from 1719 and the late baroque column of the Holy Trinity from 1777.

References

External links

Villages in Sokolov District